Neuilly-Plaisance is a train station in Neuilly-Plaisance, Seine-Saint-Denis, 10 km (6.2 miles) from Paris Gare de Lyon.

Description 
The station is on A4 branch of RER line A, on a bridge over the Marne.

, the estimated annual attendance by the RATP Group was 5,924,171 passengers.

Service

Train 
The station is served by trains to Paris and to Marne-la-Vallée. During peak hours, 6–12 trains serve the station in both directions. At off-peak times the average waiting time is 10 minutes, or 15 minutes during the evening.

Bus connections 
The station is served by several buses:

References 

Réseau Express Régional stations
Railway stations in Seine-Saint-Denis
Railway stations in France opened in 1977